Nishad Vaidya is a Gujarati Indian television actor who was born in Gujarat and later moved to Mumbai He played a small role in Star Plus serial Pyaar Ka Dard Hai Meetha Meetha Pyaara Pyaara, then got his big break in the lead male role in Sony TV serial Amita Ka Amit. He had lost 8-9 kilos weight for his role of a young professional husband.

Television Shows

References

21st-century Indian male actors
Living people
Male actors from Gujarat
Male actors in Hindi television
Indian male television actors
Year of birth missing (living people)